Emmanuel Desurvire (born 1955) is a French researcher and writer. He is the recipient of 2007 John Tyndall Award.

Early life
Desurvire was born in 1955, in Boulogne, France to Raymond Desurvire, an aircraft engineer and Marcelle Desurvire, a psychologist.

Desurvire attended University of Paris where he received his M.S. degree in theoretical physics in 1981 and University of Nice, where he completed his Ph.D. in 1983.

Career
In 2005, he was awarded with the William Streifer Scientific Achievement Award.

In 2007, he received John Tyndall Award for his contributions in the development of Erbium-doped fiber amplifiers.

Awards
 2007: John Tyndall Award

References

1955 births
Living people
People from Boulogne-sur-Mer
University of Paris alumni
Côte d'Azur University alumni
20th-century French male writers